Kinga Fabó, (1 November 1953 - 4 March 2021) was a Hungarian poet, linguist and essayist.

Brief biography

From 1972 to 1977 Kinga Fabó studied English at School of English and American Studies of the Faculty of Humanities of the Eötvös Loránd University. From 1978 to 1980 she was an associate professor of historical linguistics at that same university, and from 1981 to 1986 an associate professor of linguistics at Magyar Tudományos Akadémia (Hungarian Academy of Sciences). She has worked as a writer and poet, and has researched philosophy of language and critical approaches to literature. Some of her poems have been translated to English, Esperanto and other languages.

Works
 1980: Értékváltozások a 19. század második felében (Changes in values in the second half of the 19th century), Analysis of etiquette handbooks
 1984: Maradj még idegen (Stay even stranger), radio play, directed in 1995 by Ferenc Grunwalsky
 1987: A határon (On the verge), essays
 1988: Anesztézia (Anæsthesia), poems
 1992: A fül (The ears), poems
 1994: Ellenfülbevaló (Against earrings), poems
 1996: Elég, ha én tudom (I am enough to know it), poems
 2002: Fojtott intenzitással, fojtottan (Suffocated with force), poems

Essays and studies
 1978: Gyakorító és mozzanatos képzôk a mai magyar nyelvben
 1984: A szófajváltás
 1985: Az aspektus egy lehetséges formális definíciója és jellemzése (Aspect - possible formal definition and characterization)
 1986: A nyelvhelyességi szabályok jellege (Rules of natural grammar)
 1986: Mindennapi élet, erkölcs, mûvészet (Everyday life, morality and art) 
 1993: Végrehajtja és elszenvedi. A hermeneutika mint a medialitás filozófiája (Performance and suffering: hermeneutics and philosophy) 
 1995: Névadónak lenni megnevezett helyett. Kertész Imrérôl
 1996: Egy lehetséges posztmodern filozófia (A possible postmodern philosophy)

References

External links
 Péter Hermann, MTI ki kicsoda 2009 Szerk (MTI who's who). Budapest: Magyar Távirati Iroda (Hungarian News Agency), 2008. 
 Kinga Fabó website
 Fabó, Kinga, Belletrist Association website
 Fabó, Kinga, Kortárs Magyar Írók (Contemporary Hungarian Writers)

Linguists from Hungary
Hungarian essayists
Hungarian women essayists
Hungarian women poets
1953 births
Living people
20th-century Hungarian women writers
20th-century Hungarian poets
21st-century Hungarian poets
20th-century essayists
21st-century essayists
21st-century Hungarian women writers